Gurbuz District is situated in the southeast part of Khost Province, Afghanistan. It borders Tani District to the west, Mando Zayi and Khost districts to the north and Khyber Pakhtunkhwa in Pakistan to the southeast. Governor of Gurbuz District is Abdulhai Zazi. The Afghan National Security Forces (ANSF) are responsible for all law enforcement activities in the district.

According to Afghanistan's National Statistics and Information Authority (NSIA), the 2020 estimated population of the district was 29,627 people. The district center is the village of Sekhamir Kalay situated in the northwestern part of the district. It is inhabited by Gurbuz, a Wazir subtribe.

See also
Districts of Afghanistan

References

External links 
AIMS District Map
Refugees Assessment in Gurbuz, Tani District of Khost Province by COAR (23 May 2019)

Districts of Khost Province